One Man in a Million is a 1921 American silent drama film directed by George Beban and starring Beban, Helen Jerome Eddy and Irene Rich.

Cast
 George Beban as 	Lupino Delchini
 Helen Jerome Eddy as Flora Valenzi
 Irene Rich as Madame Maureveau
 Lloyd Whitlock as Clyde Hartley
 George B. Williams as Gustave Koppel
 Jennie Lee as 	Mrs. Koppel
 Wade Boteler as Immigration Inspector
 George Beban Jr. as The Belgian Waif
 Barbara Maier as 	Little Girl

References

Bibliography
 Connelly, Robert B. The Silents: Silent Feature Films, 1910-36, Volume 40, Issue 2. December Press, 1998.
 Munden, Kenneth White. The American Film Institute Catalog of Motion Pictures Produced in the United States, Part 1. University of California Press, 1997.

External links
 

1921 films
1921 drama films
1920s English-language films
American silent feature films
Silent American drama films
American black-and-white films
Films directed by George Beban
Film Booking Offices of America films
1920s American films